Raffaele Di Gennaro (born 3 October 1993) is an Italian footballer who plays as a goalkeeper for  club Gubbio.

Club career

Inter Milan 
Di Gennaro was the starting goalkeeper for Inter Milan U19, who ended up winning the NextGen Series and the Campionato Nazionale Primavera. Di Gennaro missed half of both the 2010–11 and 2011–12 seasons due to injury. Di Gennaro remained as one of the keeper for Primavera in 2012–13 season as an overage player.

Loan to Cittadella 
In July 2013, Di Gennaro was loaned out to Serie B club Cittadella He made his professional debut on 11 August in the second round of Coppa Italia in a 1–0 home win over Savona. Six days later, on 18 August, he played in third round in a 4–0 away defeat against Inter. On 24 August, Di Gennaro made his Serie B debut and he kept his first clean sheet for Cittadella in a 0–0 away draw against Spezia. On 14 September he kept his second clean sheet in a 0–0 home draw against Latina. Two weeks later his third in a 1–0 home win over Crotone. Di Gennaro ended his loan to Cittadella with 41 appearances and 12 clean sheets and conceding 50 goals.

Loan to Latina 
On 11 July 2014, Di Gennaro was signed by Latina on a season-long loan deal. On 4 October he made his debut for Latina in Serie B in a 1–0 away defeat against Trapani, in his debut match he received a red card. On 6 December, Di Gennaro kept his first clean sheet for Latina in a 0–0 away draw against Perugia. Nine days later he kept his second clean sheet in a 1–0 home win over Varese, and on 28 December his third in a 0–0 away draw against Modena. Di Gennaro ended his loan to Latina with 28 appearances, 11 clean sheets and 23 goals conceded.

On 11 July 2015, he returned to Serie B side Latina for his second loan spell. On 9 August, Di Gennaro played his first match of the season for Latina in the second round of Coppa Italia in a 4–1 home defeat against Pavia. On 6 September he made his "second" Serie B debut for the club in a 1–1 away draw against Novara. On 11 October, Di Gennaro kept his first clean sheet of the season in a 2–0 away win over Modena. On 15 November 2016 he injured his hand during a match against Avellino, after that he become the second goalkeeper, but he did not play any other matches. Di Gennaro ended his second loan to Latina with 13 appearances, he kept only 3 clean sheets and conceded 19 goals.

Loan to Ternana 
On 19 August 2016, Di Gennaro and Fabio Della Giovanna were loaned out to Serie B side Ternana on a season-long loan. On 7 September his made his debut for Ternana and he kept his first clean sheet for the club in Serie B in a 1–0 win over Pisa. On 20 September he kept his second clean sheet in a 0–0 home draw against Bari. He became the second goalkeeper after the arrival of Simone Aresti on loan from Pescara. Di Gennaro kept only those 2 clean sheets in 16 matches played for Ternana, he conceded 23 goals.

Loan to Spezia 
On 12 July 2017, Di Gennaro and Francesco Forte were signed by Serie B side Spezia with a season-long loan. On 3 September he made his debut for Spezia in Serie B in a 1–0 home defeat against Carpi, this was his 100th professional match. Two weeks later he kept his first clean sheet for Spezia in a 0–0 away draw against Venezia. Four days later, on 19 September, he kept his second clean sheet in a 1–0 home win over Novara. On 28 October his third in a 0–0 home draw against Cittadella. Di Gennaro ended his season-long loan to Spezia with 23 appearances, 11 clean sheets and 18 goals conceded.

Return to Inter
In 2018–19 season, Di Gennaro was included in Inter's European squad for 2018–19 UEFA Champions League as well as 2018–19 UEFA Europa League. However, Di Gennaro was excluded from the squad list that submitted to Serie A. He was assigned number 93 shirt.

Serie C 
On 13 August 2019, Di Gennaro joined to Serie C club Catanzaro on a free-transfer and he signed a 2-year contract.

On 14 August 2021, he moved to Pescara, also in Serie C.

On 18 July 2022, Di Gennaro signed with Gubbio.

Career statistics

Club

Honours

Club 
Inter Primavera

 Campionato Nazionale Primavera: 2010–11, 2011–12

References

1993 births
People from Saronno
Sportspeople from the Province of Varese
Footballers from Lombardy
Living people
Italian footballers
Italy youth international footballers
Association football goalkeepers
Inter Milan players
A.S. Cittadella players
Latina Calcio 1932 players
Ternana Calcio players
Spezia Calcio players
U.S. Catanzaro 1929 players
Delfino Pescara 1936 players
A.S. Gubbio 1910 players
Serie B players
Serie C players